Event may refer to:

Gatherings of people
 Ceremony, an event of ritual significance, performed on a special occasion
 Convention (meeting), a gathering of individuals engaged in some common interest
 Event management, the organization of events
 Festival, an event that celebrates some unique aspect of a community
 Happening, a type of artistic performance
 Media event, an event created for publicity
 Party, a social, recreational or corporate events held
 Sporting event, at which athletic competition takes place
 Virtual event, a gathering of individuals within a virtual environment

Science, technology, and mathematics
 Event (computing), a software message indicating that something has happened, such as a keystroke or mouse click
 Event (philosophy), an object in time, or an instantiation of a property in an object
 Event (probability theory), a set of outcomes to which a probability is assigned
 Event (relativity), a point in space at an instant in time, i.e. a location in spacetime
 Event (synchronization primitive), a type of synchronization mechanism
 Event (UML), in Unified Modeling Language, a notable occurrence at a particular point in time
 Event (particle physics), refers to the results just after a fundamental interaction took place between subatomic particles
 Event horizon, a boundary in spacetime, typically surrounding a black hole, beyond which events cannot affect an exterior observer
 Extinction event, a sharp decrease in the number of extant species in a short period of time
 Impact event, in which an extraterrestrial object impacts planet
 Mental event, something that happens in the mind, such as a thought

Arts and entertainment
 Event film, a term used to describe highly-anticipated blockbusters
 The Event, an American conspiracy thriller television series for NBC
 The Event (2003 film), directed by Thom Fitzgerald
 The Event (2015 film), directed by Sergei Loznitsa
 Derren Brown: The Events, a Channel 4 television series featuring the illusionist Derren Brown
 Event, a literary magazine published by Douglas College

Business
 Event Communications, a London-based museum design consultancy

See also
 Accident, an accident is an unintended, normally unwanted event that was not directly caused by humans.
 Competition, a contest between organisms, animals, individuals, groups, etc.
 Disaster, an event causing significant damage or destruction, loss of life, or change to the environment
 Event chain methodology, in project management
 Eventing, an equestrian event comprising dressage, cross-country and show-jumping
 Eventive (disambiguation)
 Grouped Events, in philosophy, the experience of two or more events that occur in sequence or concurrently that can be subsequently categorized
 Event (yacht), a  yacht built by Amels Holland B.V.
 News, new information or information on current events
 Phenomenon, any observable occurrence
 Portal:Current events, (Wikipedia portal)
 Sequence of events
 Sustainable event management or Event Greening
 The Event (disambiguation)